Leon Gray, also known as Hot Dollar (born Leon Gray) is a rapper born in Chicago, Illinois, raised in Hattisburg, Mississippi and based in Compton, California. He's best known for his 2007 single "Two Steppin' (Streets on Lock)", which samples Tupac's "All Eyes On Me". Rick Ross and Gucci Mane appear on a remix of the track.

Most recently, Hot Dollar released a single in October 2011 titled "Where Is The Love At?".

Discography

Mixtapes
2006: Crack Head Mixtape
2007: Money Power and Techs
2007: 100 Laws of Power
2008: My Dreams...A Day In the Life
2008: The Crackhead Mixtape Volume 2
2014: Evolution

Singles
2007: "Streetz On Lock"
2007: "Sidekick"
2011: "Bang Bang Boogie" (featuring Tayf3rd)

Guest appearances
2009: Hectic - "On the Westside" (I'm a Hustler)
2008: Ditch - "Por Vida" (Public Intoxication")

 References 

External links
www.iamhotdollar.com
Hot Dollar interview, DJBooth.netReid, Nateiri (2007) "Hot Dollar: Streets On Lock", Baller Status''
 http://www.undergroundgirlsofhiphop.com

African-American male rappers
Living people
Musicians from Compton, California
Rappers from Los Angeles
21st-century American rappers
21st-century American male musicians
Year of birth missing (living people)
21st-century African-American musicians